Tatiana Golovin was the defending champion, but chose not to participate that year.

Sara Errani won in the final 6–3, 6–3, against Anabel Medina Garrigues.

Seeds

Draw

Finals

Top half

Bottom half

External links
Draw and Qualifying Draw

Singles
Banka Koper Slovenia Open